Ulsan Airport  is an airport in Ulsan, South Korea. In 2018, 817,341 passengers used the airport.

Airlines and destinations

Facility
 Passenger Terminal: 8,651 m2
 Runway:   Direction=     18/36 ;   Length x Width = 2000 m x 45 m
 Apron: 3,480 m2 (Four B737s can be parked simultaneously.)

Ground Transportations

Bus
 102, 111, 122, 203, 205, 216, 225, 235, 236, 256, 266, 402, 412, 422, 432, 442, 453, 702, 714, 732, 1127, 5005(to KTX Ulsan Station)

References

External links
 Ulsan Airport (in English)
 Ulsan's Travelguide
 
 

Airports in South Korea
Airports established in 1970
1970 establishments in South Korea
20th-century architecture in South Korea